Dobrohošť is name of several places:
 Dobrohošť, Dunajská Streda District - village in Slovakia
 Dobrohošť (Jindřichův Hradec District) - village in the Czech Republic